Alva Noë (born 1964) is an American philosopher. He is Professor of Philosophy at the University of California, Berkeley. The focus of his work is the theory of perception and consciousness. In addition to these problems in cognitive science and the philosophy of mind, he is interested in analytic phenomenology, the theory of art, Ludwig Wittgenstein, enactivism, and the origins of analytic philosophy.

Education
Noë received his B.A. from Columbia University. He also holds a  B.Phil. from the University of Oxford and a Ph.D. from Harvard University.

Philosophical work
Noë joined the UC Berkeley Department of Philosophy as an associate professor in 2003, where he was a member of the UC Berkeley Institute for Cognitive and Brain Sciences, serving as a core faculty member for the Program in Cognitive Science and the Center for New Media. During 2011–2012, he was Distinguished Professor of Philosophy at the City University of New York Graduate Center.  Before coming to Berkeley, Noë was an assistant professor of philosophy at UC Santa Cruz. He has been a Post-doctoral Research Associate of the Center for Cognitive Studies at Tufts University, a visiting scholar at the Department of Logic and Philosophy of Science at UC Irvine and at the Institut Jean-Nicod (CNRS/EN/EHESS) in Paris, a McDonnell-Pew Visiting Fellow at the Oxford Center for Cognitive Neuroscience, and a visiting scholar at the Center for Subjectivity Research at the University of Copenhagen. Noë has been a recipient of a UC President's Fellowship in the Humanities and an ACLS/Ryskamp Fellowship, and in 2007–2008 was a research fellow at the Wissenschaftskolleg zu Berlin.

Noë is the author of the books Strange Tools (2015),Varieties of Presence (2012), Out of Our Heads (2009) and Action In Perception (MIT Press, 2004). He is the co-editor of Vision and Mind: Selected Readings in the Philosophy of Perception (MIT Press, 2002) and the author of Is the Visual World a Grand Illusion? (Imprint Academic, 2002).  In Action In Perception, Noë puts forth the notion of the sensorimotor profile.  Externalism about the mind and mental content is a pervasive theme in his work.

References

External links
 Interview with Noë on NYC radio
 Why You Are Not Your Brain?

1964 births
Philosophers of mind
Living people
American cognitive scientists
City University of New York faculty
University of California, Santa Cruz faculty
University of California, Berkeley faculty
Harvard University alumni
Alumni of the University of Oxford
Columbia College (New York) alumni